Varanasi is an upcoming Indian thriller Bollywood film, written and directed by Aryaman Keshu.

Raima Sen will be seen playing lead role in the film.

Plot
The film is partially inspired from the terror attacks that shook the holy city of Varanasi in 2006.

Cast
Raima Sen
Om Puri
Ravi Kishan
Rahul Dev
Aankit HS Vyas

Production 
Silver light entertainment 
Atul Raj Productions 
Morning star

Development
The official announcement of the film was announced in the second half of September 2016. The title of the film was said to be Varanasi.

Casting
The makers of the film have decided to cast Raima Sen, along with Om Puri, Ravi Kishan and Rahul Dev in the film.

Filming
The principal photography of the film will commence sometime in October 2016.

Soundtrack

Release

References

External links
 

2018 films
Indian thriller films
2010s Hindi-language films
Films set in Mumbai
2018 thriller films
Hindi-language thriller films